The Edmonton Trappers were a minor league baseball team in Edmonton, Alberta. They were a part of the Triple-A level in the Pacific Coast League, ending with the 2004 season. Their home games were played at Telus Field in downtown Edmonton.

The Trappers joined the PCL in 1981 when Edmonton businessman Peter Pocklington purchased the Ogden A's franchise from Utah trucker Dennis Job. The team's games were originally played in Renfrew Park (later called John Ducey Park). The Trappers were immediately popular with the community, often above the league average in attendance, attracting almost half a million fans every season. A total of 8 million fans came to see them play over the course of their 24-year existence.

In 1984, the Trappers (then the Triple-A affiliate of the California Angels) became the first Canadian franchise to win a championship. They were also the only team to win a PCL championship, and first to win any championship, under affiliation with the Angels. The manager was Moose Stubing.

In 1995, John Ducey Park was torn down and replaced by Telus Field where the Trappers celebrated three PCL titles in their last decade, most recently in 2002 under the affiliation of the Minnesota Twins. In 2003, the team became the major affiliate of the Montréal Expos. The Trappers were one of the most successful, longest running, and second-to-last affiliated team in Canada.

In 2004, future Montreal Expos and Toronto Blue Jays pitcher Scott Downs threw a no-hitter against Las Vegas on June 11. It was the first no hitter by a Trapper since August 8, 1996, when Aaron Small threw one against the Vancouver Canadians.

Edmonton qualified for playoffs for the last time in September 2003. They defeated the Portland Beavers to make the post-season, but were eliminated immediately by the Sacramento River Cats in a three-game sweep.

In October 2003, the Trappers' fate in Edmonton was sealed when the team, then owned by the Canadian Football League's Edmonton Eskimos, was sold to a group led by hall of famer Nolan Ryan and his son Reid. The sale shocked many fans in Edmonton. The Ryans moved the team after the 2004 season to Round Rock, Texas, a suburb north of Austin, and it was renamed the Round Rock Express. The last home game in Edmonton had a sizeable crowd against the Las Vegas 51s, but it was rained out after only one inning.

Notable former Trappers

Baseball Hall of Fame
  Bert Blyleven (player, 2011 induction)

References

External links
 Edmonton Trappers website (archive.org)

Baseball teams established in 1981
Sports clubs disestablished in 2004
Baseball teams in Alberta
Tra
Defunct baseball teams in Canada
Defunct Pacific Coast League teams
Anaheim Angels minor league affiliates
Chicago White Sox minor league affiliates
California Angels minor league affiliates
Miami Marlins minor league affiliates
Oakland Athletics minor league affiliates
Los Angeles Angels of Anaheim minor league affiliates
Minnesota Twins minor league affiliates
Montreal Expos minor league affiliates
Baseball teams disestablished in 2004